Karin Jöns (born 29 April 1953 in Kiel) is a German politician and former Member of the European Parliament with the Social Democratic Party of Germany. During her time in parliament she was part of the Socialist Group and was on the European Parliament's Committee on Employment and Social Affairs.

She was a substitute for the Committee on Women's Rights and Gender Equality and the Committee on the Environment, Public Health and Food Safety. She also was a member of the Delegation to the EU-Kazakhstan, EU-Kyrgyzstan and EU-Uzbekistan Parliamentary Cooperation Committees, and for relations with Tajikistan, Turkmenistan and Mongolia.

Education
 1977: Graduate in political science and history
 1980: Graduate in Slavonic studies

Career
 1976-1978: Freelance journalist
 1978-1980: editor attached to the Central Executive Committee of the ÖTV (Public Service, Transport and Communications Workers' Union)
 1981-1982: Press officer in Bonn of the Senator for Federal Affairs of the Free Hanseatic City of Bremen
 1983-1986: head of the Bonn office of the Federal Republic's representative for cultural affairs under the Treaty on Franco-German Cooperation
 1986-1987: International and European affairs officer in the state chancellery of North Rhine-Westphalia
 1987-1994: organisation and management of Bremen's office in Brussels for liaison with the European Union
 since 1973: Member of the SPD
 since 1998: Member of Bremen SPD Land Executive Committee
 since 1994: Member of the European Parliament
 Member of the United Service Sector Union ver.di (formerly the ÖTV and IG Medien (media workers' union))
 Member of the Workers' Welfare Association (AWO)
 Member of Europa-Union Germany
 Member of Amnesty International and Refugio e.V
 Chairwoman of Nationales Forum Deutschland e.V
 since 2000: within Europa Donna, the European Breast Cancer Coalition

See also
 2004 European Parliament election in Germany

External links
 
 
 

1953 births
Living people
Press secretaries
Social Democratic Party of Germany MEPs
MEPs for Germany 1994–1999
MEPs for Germany 1999–2004
MEPs for Germany 2004–2009
20th-century women MEPs for Germany
21st-century women MEPs for Germany